Wilhelm Ritter von Hertz (24 September 1835 – 7 January 1902) was a German writer.  He was born in Stuttgart.

Literary works 
 Dramatische Märchenspiele (between 1847 and 1848)
 Lancelot und Ginerva (1860)
 Das Rolandslied (1861)
 Der Werwolf (1862)
 Marie de France (1862)
 Hugdietrichs Brautfahrt (epic from 1863)
 Aucassin und Nicolette (translation from 1865)
 Heinrich von Schwaben (epic from 1867)
 Gottfried von Straßburg (translation from 1877)
 Bruder Rausch (epic from 1882) (ISBN B0000BRKXY)
 Spielmannsbuch (translation from 1886)
 Am Grabe der Mutter
 Ezzelin (presumed lost)
 Geist der Jugend from Album für Deutschlands Töchter

Literary References 
 Hermann Greiner: Wilhelm Hertz – ein Tübinger Franke (Tübingen 1996)
 Gerhard Hay: W. Hertz in Neue deutsche Biographie, Bd. 8. (Hrsg.: Historische Kommission der bayrischen Akademie der Wissenschaften) (Berlin 1969)
 Isolde Kurz: Aus meinem Jugendlande (Tübingen 1975)
 Erich Müller: Wilhelm Hertz als Epiker (Dissertation München 1922)
 Helene Raff: Wilhelm Hertz – Zum 100. Geburtstag des schwäbischen Dichters (In: Stuttgarter Neues Tagblatt, Nr. 444) (21. September 1935)
 Rudolf Reiser: Thomas Mann – ein vergessener TH-Student (In: Süddeutsche Zeitung, Nr. 32) (February 4, 1994)
 Kurt von Stutterheim: Wilhelm Hertz als Lyriker (Dissertation Tübingen 1913)

External links
 
 

German lyricists
19th-century German historians
Writers from Stuttgart
1835 births
1902 deaths
German male non-fiction writers